
Gmina Dobroszyce is a rural gmina (administrative district) in Oleśnica County, Lower Silesian Voivodeship, in south-western Poland.

It is part of the larger Wrocław metropolitan area.

Neighbouring gminas
Gmina Dobroszyce is bordered by the gminas of Długołęka, Krośnice, Oleśnica, Twardogóra and Zawonia.

Villages
The gmina contains the villages of Bartków, Białe Błoto, Dobra, Dobroszyce, Dobrzeń, Łuczyna, Malerzów, Mękarzowice, Miodary, Nowica, Nowosiedlice, Sadków, Siekierowice and Strzelce.

References

Dobroszyce
Oleśnica County

de:Dobroszyce#Gemeinde